The Rest of Us is a 2019 Canadian drama film, directed by Aisling Chin-Yee. It stars Heather Graham as a single mother (to Sophie Nélisse's character), who reluctantly takes in her ex-husband's second wife and their daughter (played by Jodi Balfour and Abigail Pniowsky) as houseguests after his untimely death leaves his new family homeless.

It premiered at the 2019 Toronto International Film Festival, and was acquired by levelFILM for Canadian distribution.

Cast

Production 
The film was shot in North Bay, Ontario in 2018.

Critical reception 

The Hollywood Reporter's Sheri Linden praised the film as "sharply written and sensitively played." NOW Magazine's Norman Wilner called it "a small, delicate drama—maybe too small, since the 80-minute running time has the effect of compressing certain emotional beats," but concluded, "It’s not a bad thing when a film leaves you wishing it were longer." Exclaim!'s Alex Hudson agreed that the short runtime didn't benefit the story, but wrote, "As a small-scale examination of a unique form of grief, it packs a lot of emotional complexity into a small package."

References

External links 
 
 
 
 The Rest of Us at Library and Archives Canada

2019 films
Canadian drama films
English-language Canadian films
Films about mother–daughter relationships
2019 drama films
2010s English-language films
2010s Canadian films